Area 26 can refer to:

 Area 26 (Nevada National Security Site)
 Brodmann area 26